Kanmu Seamount is a seamount lying within the Hawaiian-Emperor seamount chain in the Pacific Ocean. The last eruption of Kanmu Seamount is unknown.

See also
List of volcanoes in the Hawaiian – Emperor seamount chain

References

Hawaiian–Emperor seamount chain
Seamounts of the Pacific Ocean
Guyots
Hotspot volcanoes
Eocene volcanoes
Paleogene Oceania
Emperor Kanmu